Oris SA is a Swiss luxury manufacturer of mechanical watches. The company was founded in 1904 and is based in Hölstein in the canton of Basel-Landschaft.

History

Genesis and early growth 
Oris was founded by Paul Cattin and Georges Christian in the Swiss town of Hölstein. They bought the recently closed Lohner & Co watch factory, and on June 1, 1904 the two men entered into a contract with the local mayor. They named their new watch company Oris after a nearby brook, and they began the industrial manufacture of pocket watches. In its founding year, Oris employed 67 people.

In 1906, the firm opened an assembly plant and second factory in the nearby town of Holderbank. Another factory followed in Como in 1908. By 1911, Oris had become the largest employer in Hölstein, with over 300 workers. To entice more watchmakers, it built houses and apartments for its staff, and it expanded so that by 1929 it had additional factories in Courgenay (1916), Herbetswil (1925) and Ziefen (1925).

The first Oris wristwatches 
With the opening of the Ziefen factory and the electroplating plant in Herbetswil, Oris expanded its product range. The company began to fit bracelet buckles to its pocket watches, thereby transforming them into fully-fledged wristwatches.

In 1927, company co-founder Georges Christian died and Jacques-David LeCoultre became President of the Board of Directors. Jacques-David LeCoultre was Antoine LeCoultre’s grandson and the man who merged with Edmond Jaeger to form Jaeger-LeCoultre in 1937. Following the death of Georges Christian a year earlier, Oscar Herzog, Christian's brother-in-law, took over as General Manager in 1928, a position he held for 43 years.

First alarm clocks 
In 1936, Oris opened its own dial factory in Biel/Bienne. By that time, the company produced almost every element of its watch and clock products in-house. Oris introduced its signature pilot’s watch in 1938, the so-called Big Crown. The collection takes its name from the watch’s oversized crown, employed as an aid to pilots who adjust their watches while wearing leather gloves. Variations on this watch are still produced today.

During the Second World War, Oris’s distribution network beyond Switzerland was reduced significantly. To keep business alive, the company started manufacturing alarm clocks. With the end of the war, the company expanded again.

The Swiss Watch Statute 
On March 12, 1934, the Swiss government introduced the so-called ‘Watch Statute’. This peculiar law designed to protect and regulate the industry prevented watch companies from introducing new technologies without permission. For Oris, the statute proved to be an obstacle; because until that point, Oris had been using pin-lever escapement (Roskopf escapement) movements, which were claimed to be less accurate than the lever escapements used by some of Oris’s competitors, who had adopted such technology before the law was passed.
Despite successes with this technology, Oris took action against the Watch Statute. In 1956 the company’s General Manager Oscar Herzog hired a young lawyer by the name of Dr Rolf Portmann who spent his first 10 years at the company campaigning to reverse the Watch Statute. Subsequently, the Watch Statute was gradually liberalised until it was abolished in 1971.

The Quartz Crisis 
By the end of the 1960s, 44 per cent of all watches sold worldwide originated in Switzerland. Oris employed 800 people across a network of factories in Hölstein and beyond, and produced 1.2 million watches and clocks a year, making it one of the 10 largest watch companies in the world. The company developed its own tools and machinery, and even ran an apprenticeship scheme, training 40 engineers and watchmakers every year. 

But then came the turning point. In the 1970s and early 1980s, quartz watches from Asia gained massive market share. The so-called ‘Quartz Crisis’ meant the end for around 900 watch companies in Switzerland and unemployment for two thirds of watch industry employees. Swiss manufacturers’ market share fell to 13 per cent worldwide.

In 1970, Oris gave up its independence and became part of Allgemeine Schweizer Uhrenindustrie AG (ASUAG), the predecessor of the Swatch Group. Oris began to manufacture quartz watches, too. However, this did not restore success. In the early 1980s, Oris employed only a few dozen people. In 1981, the production of its own movements was abandoned.

New beginnings 
Like many other Swiss watch manufacturers in the early 1980s, Oris was on the verge of closure. Managing Director Dr Rolf Portmann – who was instrumental in the reversal of the Watch Statute – and Head of Marketing Ulrich W. Herzog took over the remainder of the company in 1982 as part of a management buyout. Soon after, the newly formed and independent Oris SA elected to abandon quartz and produce solely mechanical timepieces in the mid-price segment. Oris made its last quartz watch in the early 1990s.

It also produces a very small series of luxury promotional watches under the 'Saros' brand at the request of large companies for very special occasions. These watches made in Hölstein are only recognizable by the inscriptions on the back, the frame being fully dedicated to the subject of the promotion. The movements of these "made to measure" watches are mainly quartz, made in Switzerland.

Recent developments 
Since the turn of the millennium, the company has concentrated on the worlds of Diving, Culture, Aviation and Motor Sports. Since 2002, the Red Rotor has served as Oris's registered trademark and distinguishing feature. In 2004, the Quick Lock Crown system was developed, which only requires a single clockwise turn of 120 degrees to secure it in place. In 2009, Oris introduced the Rotation Safety System, a device that locks the uni-directional rotating bezel of a diving watch into place, preventing accidental adjustment underwater. Oris patented the Oris Aquis Depth Gauge, its first mechanical depth gauge, in 2013. It allows water into a channel via a small hole at 12 o’clock. Water enters the hole under pressure, creating a watermark that corresponds to a depth gauge. In 2014, Oris celebrated 110 years of watchmaking with its first in-house-developed calibre for 35 years. Calibre 110 was a hand-wound movement that featured a 10-day power reserve and a patented non-linear power reserve indicator. In 2020, Oris introduced the Calibre 400, an in-house movement which is anti-magnetic up to 2250 gauss, has a 5-day power reserve (120 hours),  a recommended 10-year service interval and comes with a 10-year warranty. 
As of the early 2020's, the brand's flagship product remains the Aquis diver watch line.
The brand remains one of the very few Swiss watch manufacturers independent from large groups such as Swatch, Richemont or LVMH.

In 2005, Oris sponsored a civic event in Hölstein which featured a smiling bear. This "Oris Bear" subsequently became the company's mascot.

Notable models 

 Big Crown (1938)
 8-Day-Clock (1949)
 Chronoris (1970)
 Oris Worldtimer (1997)
 Aquis (2011)

See also 

 Quartz Crisis

References

External links
 

Swiss watch brands
Watch manufacturing companies of Switzerland
Luxury brands
Manufacturing companies established in 1904
Basel-Landschaft